John Jairo Ulloque Pérez (born May 11, 1986) is a Colombian football midfield, who currently plays for Millonarios in Categoría Primera A.

Statistics (Official games/Colombian Ligue and Colombian Cup)
(As of November 14, 2010)

External links

1986 births
Living people
Colombian footballers
Atlético Bucaramanga footballers
Millonarios F.C. players
Association football midfielders
Sportspeople from Santander Department